The Dark Tower: The Gunslinger - The Battle of Tull is a five-issue comic book limited series published by Marvel Comics. It is the eighth comic book miniseries based on Stephen King's The Dark Tower series of novels. It is plotted by Robin Furth, scripted by Peter David, and illustrated by Michael Lark, Stefano Gaudiano, and Richard Isanove. Stephen King is the Creative and Executive Director of the project. The first issue was published on June 1, 2011.

Publication dates
Issue #1: June 1, 2011
Issue #2: July 6, 2011
Issue #3: August 3, 2011
Issue #4: September 7, 2011
Issue #5: October 5, 2011

Collected editions
The entire five-issue run of The Battle of Tull was collected into a hardcover edition, released by Marvel on January 25, 2012. A paperback edition was later released on May 7, 2013. The series was also included in the hardcover release of The Dark Tower: The Gunslinger Omnibus on September 3, 2014.

See also
The Dark Tower (comics)

References

External links

Dark Tower Official Site

2011 comics debuts
Gunslinger - Battle of Tull, The